Loren Goodman (born 1968) is an American postmodern poet and associate professor of English literature and creative writing at Underwood International College, Yonsei University, in Seoul, South Korea.

Biography and education

Goodman is a native of Wichita, Kansas. He received a BA degree in philosophy from Columbia University (1991), a MFA degree in poetry from the University of Arizona, and PhD degrees in English literature and sociology from State University of New York at Buffalo (2006) and Kobe University, respectively.

Yale Series of Younger Poets Competition

Goodman’s collection of poems Famous Americans (Yale University Press, 2003) was selected by Pulitzer Prize-winning American poet W. S. Merwin as the 2003 winner of the Yale Series of Younger Poets Competition, appearing as volume ninety-seven in the series. Merwin compared Goodman to the Dadaists and said the aim of his poetry is "plain ridicule” and the "revelation of nonsense” in the form of “comic writing” (Foreword, 2003, pp. vii, ix).

Japanese Boxing

During his studies in Japan Goodman trained as an amateur boxer. He has also written on Japanese boxing culture, including a case study with interviews of professional middleweights Keitoku Senrima, Hisashi Teraji, Yoshinori Nishizawa, Tetsu Yokozaki, Kevin Palmer, Hiromi Amada, and Nobuhiro Ishida.

Published books
 Famous Americans. New Haven, CT: Yale University Press, 2003. 81 pp. .
 Suppository Writing. Southampton, MA: Chuckwagon, 2008. 24 pp. Unpaginated.

References
 Contributor Notes. Interval(le)s 2.2-3.1 (Fall 2008/Winter 2009): pp. 1024–1036, p. 1028. Centre Interdisciplinaire de Poétique Appliquée. http://www.cipa.ulg.ac.be/intervalles4/91_contributor_notes.pdf (accessed September 10, 2010).
General Bulletin 2007–2008. N.d. pp. 58, 360. Yonsei University. http://www.yonsei.ac.kr/eng/academics/bulletin/2008bulletin.pdf (accessed September 10, 2010).
Goodman, Loren. Abstract. “Foreign Bodies: Stereotypes and Ethnicity in Boxing in Japan.” 36th World Congress of the International Institute of Sociology. 2003. https://archive.today/20110707013637/http://www.sociology.cass.cn/iis2003beijing/en/AS/S31-6.htm (accessed September 10, 2010).
Goodman, Loren. "Endless Punchers: Body, Narrative, and Performance in the World of Japanese Boxing. PhD Diss. State University of New York at Buffalo, 2006. 737 pp. University at Buffalo Libraries. http://catalog.lib.buffalo.edu/vufind/Record/002496091 (accessed September 10, 2010).
Goodman, Loren. “Medium at Large: Case Studies of Japan’s Biggest Fighters.” Interval(le)s 2.2-3.1 (Fall 2008/Winter 2009): pp. 305–343. Centre Interdisciplinaire de Poétique Appliquée. http://www.cipa.ulg.ac.be/intervalles4/29_goodman.pdf (accessed September 10, 2010).
 Merwin, W. S. Foreword. Famous Americans. By Loren Goodman. New Haven, CT: Yale University Press, 2003. pp. vii–ix.

1968 births
Living people
American male poets
Columbia College (New York) alumni
University of Arizona alumni
University at Buffalo alumni
Yale Younger Poets winners
21st-century American poets
21st-century American male writers